The Man Who is the second studio album by the Scottish rock band Travis. The album was released on 24 May 1999 through Independiente. It saw a change in musical direction for the band, moving away from the rockier tone of their debut Good Feeling (1997). Four singles were released: "Writing to Reach You", "Driftwood", and the top 10 hits "Why Does It Always Rain on Me?" and "Turn".

The Man Who initially received mixed reviews and sold slowly. Boosted by the success of "Why Does It Always Rain on Me?" and the band's appearance at the 1999 Glastonbury Festival, it eventually spent a total of 11 weeks at number one on the UK Albums Chart and brought the band international recognition, with retrospective reviews being more positive. , according to Concord Music, The Man Who has sold over 3.5 million copies worldwide. It was among ten albums nominated for the best British album of the previous 30 years by the Brit Awards in 2010, losing to (What's the Story) Morning Glory? by Oasis.

Background and recording
The Man Who was produced by Nigel Godrich and partially recorded at producer Mike Hedges' chateau in France. The majority of the songs were written before the band's debut album Good Feeling (1997) was released; "Writing to Reach You", "The Fear" and "Luv" were written around 1995–96, while "As You Are", "Turn" and "She's So Strange" date back as far as 1993 and the Glass Onion EP. The band continued recording at studios including RAK Studios and Abbey Road Studios in London.

The title The Man Who is derived from the book The Man Who Mistook His Wife for a Hat by neurologist Oliver Sacks. The album's sleeve notes include a dedication to film director Stanley Kubrick, who had died a few months prior to the album's release.

Reception

Initial reviews of The Man Who were mixed, with several publications who had championed the more rock-oriented Good Feeling criticising the album for the band's move towards melodic, melancholic material. Stuart Bailie of NME objected to the band's decision to scale back the "rowdy" aspects of Good Feeling to make a record "over-loaded with ballads", and concluded that despite the presence of some good songs, "Travis will be the best when they stop trying to make sad, classic records." Danny Eccleston of Q wrote that The Man Who loses momentum after its first four songs, with the remainder of the album being "almost tyrannically tasteful" and lacking "the most enchanting aspects of Good Feeling". Selects Steve Lowe, however, felt that even without much musical innovation or a defining statement, the album showcases the band as "ordinary chaps making extraordinarily pretty music" and "good songwriters not trying too hard".

While The Man Who initially looked as though it would mirror the success of Good Feeling, entering the UK Albums Chart at number five, it quickly slipped down the charts with little radio play of its singles, in addition to its lukewarm critical reception. However, the success of the album's third single "Why Does It Always Rain on Me?" increased awareness of the band and the album began to rise back up the charts. When Travis later performed the song at the 1999 Glastonbury Festival, after being dry for several hours, it began to rain as soon as the first line was sung. The following day, the story was all over the papers and television, and with increased word of mouth and radio play of "Why Does It Always Rain on Me?" and the album's other singles, The Man Who rose to number one on the UK Albums Chart, going on to become the year's third best-selling album in the country.

By the end of the year, the album's critical standing had improved dramatically. Select named The Man Who the best album of 1999, and the album also placed on the year-end lists of publications such as Melody Maker, Mojo, NME and Q. The Man Who won the award for Best Album at the 2000 Brit Awards, with Travis being named Best British Group. At the Ivor Novello Awards, Travis frontman Fran Healy won the awards for Best Songwriter(s) and Best Contemporary Song for "Why Does It Always Rain on Me?" The Man Who received a belated American release in early 2000, and the same year Travis undertook an extensive 237-gig world tour, including headlining the 2000 Glastonbury, T in the Park and V Festivals, and a US tour leg with Oasis.

Legacy
In 2006, The Man Who was named the 70th greatest album of all time by Q. At the 2010 Brit Awards, it was nominated for the Best Album of the Past 30 Years award, losing to Oasis's (What's the Story) Morning Glory? The album was included in the book 1001 Albums You Must Hear Before You Die. , The Man Who has sold 2,687,500 copies in the UK.

Track listing

Personnel

Travis
Fran Healy – vocals, guitar, piano
Andy Dunlop – guitar
Dougie Payne – bass guitar
Neil Primrose – drums

Additional personnel
 Nigel Godrich – mixing, production
 Sally Herbert – string arrangement (tracks 2 and 10)
 Mike Hedges – production (tracks 6, 7 and 9)
 Ian Grimble – co-production (tracks 6, 7 and 9)
 Sarah Willson – cello (track 7)

Charts and certifications

Weekly charts

Year-end charts

All-time charts

Certifications

References

External links

 The Man Who (Adobe Flash) at Radio3Net (streamed copy where licensed)

Travis (band) albums
1999 albums
Epic Records albums
Independiente Records albums
Brit Award for British Album of the Year
Albums produced by Nigel Godrich